Zamyad Co. (Persian: خودروسازی زامیاد, Xudrusazi-ye Zamyad) is an Iranian commercial vehicle manufacturing company. It was founded in 1963 as part of the RENA Industrial Group in Tehran. In 1963, the company began producing Volvo N-Model trucks. and in 1970 started production of Nissan Junior 2000 pickup. In 1998 SAIPA took over the Zamyad company, who then undertook the production of the Z24, a license built version of the 1970-1980 Nissan Junior with a 2.4-litre engine. Since 2003, this truck is sold under the Zamyad brand. Zamyad produces a rebodied version of the Z24 called the Shooka.

Products
 Zamyad Stralis
 Zamyad A36-15
 Zamyad Padra
 Zamyad Shooka
 Zamyad Z24

Environmental concerns
The company's manufacturing plant in south-east Tehran was the focus of a 2006 study of the use of treated wastewater in agriculture.

See also
Iranian car industry

References

External links
 Official Page 
 Z24 at SAIPA.

Truck manufacturers of Iran